College station or College Station may refer to:

Transportation
College station (MetroLink), a St. Louis light rail station in Saint Clair County, Illinois, United States
College station (PNR), a Philippine National Railways station in Los Baños, Laguna, Philippines
College railway station (Scotland), a former railway station in Glasgow, Scotland,  United Kingdom
College station (Toronto), a subway station in Toronto, Ontario, Canada
Du Collège station, a metro station in Montreal, Quebec, Canada

Stations with "College" in the name

United States
17th Street/Santa Monica College station, a light rail station in Santa Monica, California
68th Street–Hunter College station, a subway station in Manhattan, New York
137th Street–City College station, a subway station in Manhattan, New York
Allen/College station, a light rail station in Los Angeles, California
APU/Citrus College station, a light rail station in Azusa, California
Bedford Park Boulevard–Lehman College station, a subway station in Bronx, New York
Boston College station, a light rail station in Newton, Massachusetts
College Avenue station (Illinois), a commuter rail station in Wheaton, Illinois
College Bayside station, an automated people mover station in Miami, Florida
College Boulevard station, a light rail station in Oceanside, California
College Greens station, a light rail station in Sacramento, California
College Hill station, a former train station in Beaver Falls, Pennsylvania
College North station, an automated people mover station in Miami, Florida
Community College station, a rapid transit station in Boston, Massachusetts
Cosumnes River College station, a light rail station in Sacramento, California
Dallas College North Lake Campus station, a light rail station in Irving, Texas
Delavan/Canisius College station, a light rail station in Buffalo, New York
Flatbush Avenue–Brooklyn College station, a subway station in Brooklyn, New York
Franklin/Dean College station, a commuter rail station in Franklin, Massachusetts
Franklin Avenue–Medgar Evers College station, a subway station in Brooklyn, New York
Leeward Community College station, an under construction light metro station in Pearl City, Hawaii
GateWay Community College station, a light rail station in Phoenix, Arizona
Medford/Tufts station, an under-construction light rail station in Medford, Massachusetts, originally planned to be named College Avenue station
Palomar College station, a bus and train station in San Marcos, California
Pierce College station, a bus rapid transit station in Los Angeles, California
President Street–Medgar Evers College station, a subway station in Brooklyn, New York
Red Rocks College station, a light rail station in Lakewood, Colorado
Valley College station, a bus rapid transit station in Los Angeles, California
Vermont/Santa Monica station, a rapid transit station in Los Angeles, California, also known L.A. City College station
Veterans Way/College Avenue station, a regional transportation center in Tempe, Arizona

India
Arts College railway station, in Secunderabad, Telangana
Dharampeth College metro station, a rapid transit station in Maharashtra
Garware College metro station, a rapid transit station in Pune
Hindu College railway station, a commuter rail station in Chennai
JNTU College metro station, a rapid transit station in Hyderabad
Kilpauk Medical College metro station, a rapid transit station in Chennai
Maharaja's College metro station, a rapid transit station in Kochi
National College metro station, a rapid transit station in Bengaluru
Osmania Medical College metro station, a rapid transit station in Hyderabad
Pachaiyappa's College metro station, a rapid transit station in Chennai
Sir Theagaraya College metro station, a rapid transit station in Chennai

China
Arts College station (Hohhot Metro), a rapid transit station in Hohhot, Mongolia
Chengdu Medical College station, a rapid transit station in Kochi, 
The Police College station, a rapid transit station in Chengdu, 
Southeast University Chengxian College station, a rapid transit station in Nanjing,

Elsewhere
Dong-Pusan College station, a rapid transit station in Busan, South Korea, now named Witbansong station
Durham College Oshawa GO station a commuter rail station in Oshawa, Ontario, Canada
Gimhae College station, a light metro station in Busan, South Korea
Humber College station, an under construction light rail station in Toronto, Canada
Islamia College railway station, in Pakistan
Stadium–Songdam College station, an automated people mover station in Cheoin-gu, South Korea
Urdu College railway station, an abandoned railway station in Karachi, Pakistan
VCC–Clark station, a rapid transit station in Vancouver, Canada, named after nearby Vancouver Community College

Places
College Station, Arkansas, United States
College Station, Texas, United States

Institutions
Atlantic College Lifeboat Station, in Atlantic College, South Wales

See also
College (disambiguation)
City College station (disambiguation)
College Avenue station (disambiguation)
College Park station (disambiguation)
University Station (disambiguation)
:Category: College radio stations